The Rodoni Castle or Skanderbeg Castle is a castle in Albania.

Overview
Rodoni Castle is on the Cape of Rodon. After the victorious First Siege of Krujë the League of Lezhë decided to increase the fortifications for use against the Ottoman Empire. Skanderbeg chose the cape of Rodon as the location of the castle and construction began in 1450. The walls of the castle that was completed in 
When the Siege of Krujë started in 1466 Skanderbeg retreated to Rodoni Castle from where he and his family, together with many people from Albania, were transported to Brindisi in 14 ships. According to Marin Barleti this castle was destroyed by Ottoman forces in 1467.

In 1500 the castle was rebuilt by the Republic of Venice. As a result of the corrosive action of the sea waves, some of the walls are now under the waters of the Adriatic. Today the visitors can see the outer walls on the right side and the tower at the place they intersect.

Gallery

See also
Skanderbeg
History of Albania
Durrës
Cape of Rodon
Tourism in Albania
List of castles in Albania
Architecture of Albania
History of Albania during Ottoman administration

References

Buildings and structures completed in 1452
Castles in Albania
Buildings and structures in Durrës
Tourist attractions in Durrës County